The Akaflieg Hannover AFH-24 is a training glider designed and built in Germany.

Specifications

References

External links

1980s German sailplanes